The 2004 Indian general election polls in Chhattisgarh were held for 11 seats in the state. This is the first time, that an election took place in this state after it achieved statehood from Madhya Pradesh in 2000. The result was National Democratic Alliance winning overwhelmingly by capturing 10 out of the 11 seats, while the United Progressive Alliance, captured only 1 seat.

Results by Alliance

Results by Constituency
Keys:

References

Chhattisgarh
Indian general elections in Chhattisgarh
2000s in Chhattisgarh